Fan Jinming (born 20 January 1997) is a Chinese footballer currently playing as a goalkeeper for Zhejiang.

Club career
Fan Jinming would be promoted to the senior team of Zhejiang before being loaned out to Yunnan Flying Tigers for the 2015 China League Two campaign. He would return to his parent club where he would eventually go on to make his debut in a league game on 22 April 2017 against Baoding Yingli ETS in a 2-1 defeat. After the game he would start to establish himself as the clubs second choice goalkeeper and was given a contract extension. With the introduction of Chinese international goalkeeper Gu Chao joining the team, Fan was loaned out to Sichuan Jiuniu on 26 July 2021. This would be followed by another loan period to Xinjiang Tianshan Leopard on 7 May 2022 and then Jinan Xingzhou on 30 August 2022.

Career statistics
.

Notes

References

External links
Jinming Fan at Worldfootball.net

1997 births
Living people
Chinese footballers
China youth international footballers
Association football goalkeepers
China League Two players
Zhejiang Professional F.C. players
Yunnan Flying Tigers F.C. players
Sichuan Jiuniu F.C. players
21st-century Chinese people